The dusky purpletuft (Iodopleura fusca) is a small South American species of bird in the family Tityridae. It has traditionally been placed in the cotinga family, but evidence strongly suggest it is better placed in Tityridae, where now placed by SACC. Most of its distribution is in lowland forests in the Guianas, but it also occurs in far southeastern Venezuela, and very locally in northeastern Brazil.

References

dusky purpletuft
Birds of the Guianas
dusky purpletuft
Taxa named by Louis Jean Pierre Vieillot
Taxonomy articles created by Polbot